Frank Threlfo (1932–2012) was an Australian rugby league footballer who played in the 1950s.

Playing career
Originally from Maitland, New South Wales, Threlfo was signed by South Sydney in 1952 as a 20-year-old. 

Threlfo played two seasons with South Sydney between 1952-1953, playing on the wing in 39 first grade games. He won a premiership with Souths, playing on the wing in the victorious 1953 Grand Final team that defeated St George. 

Threlfo returned to Maitland, New South Wales the following year and saw out his rugby league career for the local Maitland team. He was awarded Life Membership of the Newcastle Rugby League, after a lifetime of commitment to Rugby League in the city Newcastle.

Death
Threlfo died on 10 October 2012, aged 80.

References

1932 births
2012 deaths
Australian rugby league players
Rugby league players from Maitland, New South Wales
Rugby league wingers
South Sydney Rabbitohs players